Alfons Bror Erik Nygaard (born 20 April 2002) is a Swedish footballer who plays for Tvååkers IF as a forward.

References

External links 
 

2002 births
Living people
Swedish footballers
Allsvenskan players
Ettan Fotboll players
IFK Göteborg players
Tvååkers IF players
Association football forwards